Viva Wisconsin is a live album by Violent Femmes. It was released in November, 1999. The songs were recorded on a six-date acoustic concert tour of their home state of Wisconsin in October 1998. The album was reissued by Shout! Factory on May 24, 2005.

Track listing

Personnel 
Violent Femmes
 Gordon Gano – vocals, guitar
 Guy Hoffman – drums, vocals, bugle
 Brian Ritchie – bass guitar, vocals, shakuhachi, xylophone, soprano saxophone, harmonica, conch shell, theremin

The Horns of Dilemma
Ray Cribb – trombone, bass guitar
Shane Gerstl – saxophone
Mike Koch – tenor saxophone
Eric Markstrum – trombone
Sigmund Snopek III – piano, vocals, oboe, flutes, bass clarinet, trombone

Production
Dave Vartanian – production

References

Violent Femmes live albums
1999 live albums
Beyond Records albums
Shout! Factory albums